Kevin Butler may refer to:
 Kevin Butler (American football) (born 1962), American football placekicker
 Kevin Butler (character), fictional character in Sony's PlayStation 3 marketing campaigns
 Kevin Butler (streetball player), aka "Bizness", American streetball player